Claudio Prieto  (24 November 1934 – 5 April 2015) was a Spanish composer He was born in Muñeca de la Peña,
Palencia and began his musical career as a boy in the mid-20th century playing various musical instruments for the municipal band of Guardo. He moved to San Lorenzo de El Escorial when he was 16 years, where he began his education with the musicologist Samuel Rubio.

In 1960 he obtained a Cultural Exchange scholarship from the Spanish Ministry of Foreign Affairs admitting him to the Advanced Course taught in the Accademia Nazionale di Santa Cecilia in Rome. Over the next three years, he studied under Goffredo Petrassi, Bruno Maderna and Boris Porena. After completing the training he received a Higher Diploma from the Academy and returned to Spain. In 1967, he participated in the International Masterclass at  Darmstadt (Germany) with among others, György Ligeti, Karlheinz Stockhausen and Earle Brown.

His professional career began in Madrid with the premier at the Ateneo Auditorium of his work 'Improvisation' for chamber ensemble. In 1969 his piece 'Solo a Solo', for flute and guitar, won him "Best Spanish wor for Young Musicians award” and thereby both national and international exposure and recognition. His biography, Música, belleza y comunicación, was written by Víctor Andrés Pliego and published by Editorial Complutense in 1994.

Legacy
In Guardo, a secondary school bears his name (Instituto de Educación Secundaria or IES Claudio Prieto).

See also
 Symphony No. 4 (Claudio Prieto)

References

1934 births
2015 deaths
People from the Province of Palencia
Spanish classical composers
Spanish male classical composers
Place of death missing
20th-century Spanish musicians
20th-century Spanish male musicians